Prasat Thong (c. 1599–1656;  1629–1656) was the first king of the Prasat Thong dynasty, the fourth dynasty of the Siamese Ayutthaya Kingdom.

Accounts vary on the origin of Prasat Thong. While traditional Thai historians hold that he was an illegitimate son of King Ekathotsarot, Jeremias van Vliet's account states that he was the maternal cousin of King Songtham – his father was Okya Sithammathirat, elder brother of the mother of King Songtham. He was born during the reign of King Naresuan around 1599 and was known to have caused mischief in the royal court. He ruined the palace Agricultural Initiation Ceremony, royal ceremony of ploughing, and was threatened with imprisonment; only pleas from the queen of King Naresuan, Chao Khruamanichan, won a reduction of the punishment to five months imprisonment. He was later pardoned and given the title of Okya Siworawong, or Phraya Siworawong – a high-ranking title of royal page.

Rise to power
The rise of Prasat Thong to power was documented in van Vliet's The Historical Account of the war of Succession following the death of King Pra Interajatsia (1650). As the king's maternal cousin, he held great influence. It is said that he was an ambitious prince and wanted to become a king. King Songtham had had his brother Phra Phanpi Sisin or Phra Sisin (The Siamese chronicles say that Phra Sisin was one of the King Songtham's three sons.) as the Front Palace, technically his successor, but a palace faction including Prasat Thong persuaded the king to give the throne instead to his son Prince Chetthathirat. When King Songtham died in 1628, Chetthathirat ascended the throne and a great purge of the mandarins who had supported Phra Sisin was instigated, including the Samuha Kalahom or Defence Minister. Prasatthong then replaced him as the defence minister with the new title of Okya Suriyawong.

The king maker
During the King Chetthathirat’s reign, Prasat Thong had Yamada Nagamasa, the head of Japanese mercenaries then known as Okya Senaphimok, as a supporter. After Chetthathirat accession to the throne, Phra Sisin escaped into monkhood to save his life. However, he was lured into the palace with his monastic robes off and with princely attire. He was arrested and then exiled to Phetchaburi where he was thrown into a well to be starved to death. The prince was narrowly saved by the local monks who threw a body into the well as a substitute. Phra Sisin then organized a rebellion in Petchaburi. Prasatthong  sent Okya Kamhaeng and Yamada Nagamasa to lead the Japanese troops to crush the rebels. Phra Sisin was captured and executed in Ayutthaya.

With the Phra Sisin gone, Prasat Thong was in full power. In 1629, his father died. A grand funeral was held and his father's ashes were cremated twice – a practice reserved for royalty. On that day King Chetthathirat called for an audience with all the nobles but all of them had gone to the funeral – much to the king's great displeasure. The king threatened to punish Prasat Thong  but Okya Phraklang (the Minister of Trade who was Prasatthong's ally) managed to calm the king and convince him of Prasat Thong's innocence. The king was unprepared when Prasat Thong led armies into the palace. The king fled but was captured and executed. Prasat Thong  installed the king’s brother – the eleven-year-old Prince Athittayawong – as the new puppet king with Prasat Thong as the regent who crowned himself as the second king.

Coup and rebellion
Prasat Thong strived to eliminate his allies-turned-rivals – the Okya Kamhaeng who contested for the throne and Yamada Nagamasa who objected to the takeover of the throne by Prasat Thong. He quickly condemned Okya Kamhaeng for treason and execution followed. And he sent Yamada Nagamasa to the south as the governor of Ligor, away from Ayutthaya. As soon as the Japanese mandarin left the city, only about a month after his ascension, the child-king was deposed and subsequently executed. Suriyawong or Okya Suriyawong crowned himself as the full-fledged King of Siam.

Prasat Thong had acted as "king-maker" before assuming the throne, by performing the double regicide of King Songtham's sons.  Yamada, Okya Seniphimok, heard of the coup at Ayutthaya and rebelled. Prasat Thong had him poisoned and then expelled the remaining Japanese.

Reign
As a powerful and decisive leader, he promulgated many criminal laws and sometimes, according to Van Vliet, he even executed prisoners by himself.

Siam was a major trading center attracting Europeans merchants. Prasat Thong was interested in controlling the towns in the southern peninsula, perhaps because of profits from overseas trade. Ayutthaya lost northern subjugated principalities such as Chiang Mai.

Under Prasat Thong, Cambodia became subject to Siam again.  He then built the capital city using Nakhon Thom as a model and built "places of temporary rest on the way to the footprint of the Buddha."

Succession
Upon King Prasatthong’s death in 1656, Chao Fa Chai, his eldest son, succeeded his father as King Sanpet VI.

Legacy

Prasat Thong built the monastery Chumphon Nikayaram where his mother resided and a rest palace, Bang Pa-In Royal Palace, at Bang Pa-In. Multiple projects that was constructed by Prasat Thong still stands today, such as Wat Chaiwatthanaram, in Phra Nakhon Si Ayutthaya Province and the uncompleted Prasat Nakhon Luang, in Phra Nakhon Si Ayutthaya Province (later finished by King Chulalongkorn over 200 years later).

The Eulogy of King Prasat Thong, probably composed early in the reign of King Narai is a major example of the Thai tradition of royal panegyrics. It states that King Prasat Thong is a bodhisatta, invited by Indra to be reborn as the king of Ayutthaya, and destined to become the tenth in a sequence of ten future Buddhas beginning with Metteyya. It recounts the major events of the reign including religious constructions, amending the calendar, almsgivings, and festivals.

References

1599 births
1656 deaths
Prasat Thong dynasty
Kings of Ayutthaya
17th-century monarchs in Asia